The House of Todor and Ruse Micovski is a historical house in Galičnik that is listed as Cultural heritage of North Macedonia. It is in ownership of one branch of the family of Micovski.

See also
House of Dokse Lonovski
House of Slavko Brezovski
House of Iljo and Strezo Cubalevski
House of Nikola Kukovski
Galičnik Wedding Festival

External links
 National Register of objects that are cultural heritage (List updated to December 31, 2012) (In Macedonian)
 Office for Protection of Cultural Heritage (In Macedonian)

Galičnik
Cultural heritage of North Macedonia
Historic houses